Cardiac arrest is when the heart stops beating. It is a medical emergency that, without immediate medical intervention, will result in cardiac death within minutes. When it happens suddenly, it is called sudden cardiac arrest. Cardiopulmonary resuscitation (CPR) and possibly defibrillation are needed until further treatment can be provided. Cardiac arrest results in a rapid loss of consciousness, and breathing may be abnormal or absent.

While cardiac arrest may be caused by heart attack or heart failure, these are not the same, and in 15 to 25% of cases, there is a non-cardiac cause. Some individuals may experience chest pain, shortness of breath, nausea, an elevated heart rate, and a light-headed feeling immediately before entering cardiac arrest.

The most common cause of cardiac arrest is an underlying heart problem like coronary artery disease that decreases the amount of oxygenated blood supplying the heart muscle. This, in turn, damages the structure of the muscle, which can alter its function. These changes can, over time, cause ventricular fibrillation (V-fib), which most commonly precedes cardiac arrest. Less common causes include major blood loss, lack of oxygen, very low potassium, electrical injury, heart failure, inherited heart arrhythmias, and intense physical exercise. Cardiac arrest is diagnosed by the inability to find a pulse.

CPR and defibrillation can reverse a cardiac arrest, leading to return of spontaneous circulation (ROSC), but without such intervention, it will prove fatal. In some cases, cardiac arrest is an anticipated outcome of serious illnesses where death is expected. Treatment for cardiac arrest includes immediate CPR and, if a shockable rhythm is present, defibrillation. Two protocols have been established for CPR: basic life support (BLS) and advanced cardiac life support (ACLS). Among those whose pulses are reestablished, targeted temperature management may improve outcomes. In addition, the care team may initiate measures to protect the patient from brain injury and preserve brain function. In post-resuscitation care, an implantable cardiac defibrillator may be considered to reduce the chance of death from recurrence.

In the United States, approximately 535,000 cases occur annually (about 13 per 10,000 people). Of these, 326,000 (61%) experience cardiac arrest outside of a hospital setting, while 209,000 (39%) occur within a hospital. Cardiac arrest becomes more common with age and affects males more often than females.

The percentage of people who survive out-of-hospital cardiac arrest (OHCA) with treatment by emergency medical services is about 8%. Fiction has often portrayed the immediate survival rate of cardiac arrest to be unreasonably high. This may contribute to misinformed expectations of resuscitative efforts from the general public, with many studies showing the expected survival rate of resuscitative efforts after cardiac arrest exceeding 40–50%. These portrayals may also contribute to a patient's or medical decision maker's desire to pursue aggressive measures. One study suggests many of the critically ill are less likely to choose resuscitation when given accurate information about its limitations.

In the event that cardiopulmonary resuscitation is successful, complete recovery is not guaranteed as many survivors experience an array of disabilities, including partial paralysis; seizures; difficulty with walking, speaking, or memory; limited consciousness; or persistent vegetative state and brain death.

Signs and symptoms
Cardiac arrest is not preceded by any warning symptoms in approximately 50 percent of people. For individuals who do experience symptoms, the symptoms are usually nonspecific to the cardiac arrest. This can present in the form of new or worsening:
 chest pain
 fatigue
 blackouts
 dizziness
 shortness of breath
 weakness
 vomiting
When cardiac arrest is suspected due to signs of unconsciousness or abnormal breathing, a bystander should attempt to feel a pulse for 10 seconds; if no pulse is felt, it should be assumed the victim is in cardiac arrest. As a result of loss of cerebral perfusion (blood flow to the brain), the person will rapidly lose consciousness and can stop breathing. Near-death experiences are reported by 10 to 20 percent of people who survived cardiac arrest, which demonstrates a certain level of cognitive processes that are still active during resuscitation.

Risk factors 
The risk factors for sudden cardiac arrest (SCA) are similar to those of coronary artery disease and include age, cigarette smoking, high blood pressure, high cholesterol, lack of physical exercise, obesity, diabetes, and family history and Cardiomyopathy of cardiac disease. A prior episode of sudden cardiac arrest also increases the likelihood of future episodes. A statistical analysis of many of these risk factors determined that approximately 50% of all cardiac arrests occur in 10% of the population perceived to be at greatest risk due to aggregate harm of multiple risk factors, demonstrating that cumulative risk of multiple comorbidities exceeds the sum of each risk individually.

Previous adverse cardiac events, non-sustained ventricular tachycardia (NSVT), syncope, and left ventricular hypertrophy (LVT) have been shown to predict sudden cardiac death in children. Current cigarette smokers with coronary artery disease were found to have a two to threefold increase in the risk of sudden death between ages 30 and 59. Furthermore, it was found that former smokers' risk was closer to that of those who had never smoked.

Functional changes in the heart such as reduced ejection fraction or cardiac arrhythmia have been shown to increase the risk of cardiac arrest and act independently from the aforementioned risk factors. Conditions that produce these functional changes can be acquired following previous cardiac injury or inherited through familial history of arrhythmogenic disorders.

Causes and mechanisms

Sudden cardiac arrest (SCA), or sudden cardiac death (SCD), occurs when the heart abruptly begins to beat in an abnormal or irregular rhythm (arrhythmia). Without organized electrical activity in the heart muscle, there is no consistent contraction of the ventricles, which results in the heart's inability to generate an adequate cardiac output (forward pumping of blood from the heart to the rest of the body). There are many different types of arrhythmias, but the ones most frequently recorded in sudden cardiac arrest are ventricular tachycardia and ventricular fibrillation. Less common causes of dysrhythmias in cardiac arrest include pulseless electrical activity (PEA), bradyarrhythmias, or asystole. Such rhythms are seen when there is prolonged cardiac arrest, progression of ventricular fibrillation, or efforts like defibrillation executed to resuscitate the person. The rhythm changes also appear to correlate with the underlying cause of cardiac injury when present (ischemic vs. nonischemic causes).

Sudden cardiac arrest can result from cardiac and non-cardiac causes including the following:

Cardiac causes

Coronary artery disease 

Coronary artery disease (CAD), also known as ischemic heart disease, is responsible for 62 to 70 percent of all sudden cardiac deaths. CAD is a much less frequent cause of sudden cardiac death in people under the age of 40. Cases have shown that the most common finding at postmortem examination of sudden cardiac death is chronic high-grade stenosis of at least one segment of a major coronary artery, an artery that supplies the heart muscle with its blood supply. This stenosis is often the result of narrowing and hardening of the arteries following deposition of cholesterol plaques and inflammation over several years. This accumulation and remodeling of the coronary vessels along with other systemic blood vessels characterizes the progression of Atherosclerotic Cardiovascular Disease. When a stable plaque ruptures, it can block the flow of blood and oxygen through small arteries resulting in ischemic injury as a result. The injury to tissue following ischemia can lead to structural and functional changes preventing the heart from continuing normal conduction cycles and altering heart rate.

Non-atherosclerotic coronary artery abnormalities 

Abnormalities of the coronary arteries not related to atherosclerosis include congenital coronary artery anomalies (most commonly anomalous origin of the left coronary artery from the pulmonary artery), inflammation known as coronary arteritis, embolism, vasospasm, and mechanical abnormalities related to connective tissue diseases or trauma. These conditions account for 10-15% of cardiac arrest and sudden cardiac death.
 Coronary arteritis commonly results from a pediatric febrile inflammatory condition known as Kawasaki disease. Other vasculitides can also contribute to an increased risk of sudden cardiac death.
 Embolism, or clotting, of the coronary arteries most commonly occurs from septic emboli secondary to endocarditis with involvement of the aortic valve, tricuspid valve, or prosthetic valves.
 Coronary vasospasm may result in cardiac arrhythmias, altering the heart's electrical conduction with a risk of complete cardiac arrest from severe or prolonged rhythm changes.
 Mechanical abnormalities with an associated risk of cardiac arrest may arise from coronary artery dissection, which can be attributed to Marfan Syndrome or trauma.

Structural heart disease

Structural heart diseases unrelated to coronary artery disease account for 10% of all sudden cardiac deaths. Examples of these include: cardiomyopathies (hypertrophic, dilated, or arrhythmogenic), cardiac rhythm disturbances, myocarditis, hypertensive heart disease, and congestive heart failure.

Left ventricular hypertrophy is thought to be a leading cause of sudden cardiac deaths in the adult population. This is most commonly the result of longstanding high blood pressure, or hypertension, which has caused a maladaptive change to the wall of the heart's main pumping chamber, the left ventricle. Increased blood pressure means the heart must pump harder to adequately circulate blood throughout the body. If the heart does this for a prolonged period of time due to uncontrolled hypertension, the left ventricle can experience hypertrophy (grow larger) in a way that decreases the heart's effectiveness. Left ventricular hypertrophy can be demonstrated on an echocardiogram and electrocardiogram (EKG).

A 1999 review of sudden cardiac deaths in the United States found that structural heart diseases accounted for over 30% of sudden cardiac arrests for those under 30 years. A study of military recruits ages 18-35 found that this accounted for over 40% of sudden cardiac deaths.

Congestive heart failure increases the risk of sudden cardiac death fivefold.

Structural abnormalities of the cardiac conduction system (notably the Atrioventricular Node and His-Purkinje system) may predispose an individual to arrhythmias with a risk of progressing to sudden cardiac arrest, albeit this risk remains low. Many of these conduction blocks can be treated with internal cardiac defibrillators for those determined to be at high risk due to severity of fibrosis or severe electrophysiologic disturbances.

Inherited arrhythmia syndromes 
Arrhythmias not due to structural heart disease account for 5 to 10% of sudden cardiac arrests. These are frequently caused by genetic disorders that lead to abnormal heart rhythms. The genetic mutations often affect specialized proteins known as ion channels that conduct electrically charged particles across the cell membrane, and this group of conditions is therefore often referred to as channelopathies. Examples of these inherited arrhythmia syndromes include Long QT syndrome (LQTS), Brugada Syndrome, Catecholaminergic polymorphic ventricular tachycardia, and Short QT syndrome. Many are also associated with environmental or neurogenic triggers such as response to loud sounds that can initiate lethal arrhythmias. Other conditions that promote arrhythmias but are not caused by genetic mutations include Wolff-Parkinson-White syndrome.

Long QT syndrome, a condition often mentioned in young people's deaths, occurs in one of every 5000 to 7000 newborns and is estimated to be responsible for 3000 deaths annually compared to the approximately 300,000 cardiac arrests seen by emergency services. These conditions are a fraction of the overall deaths related to cardiac arrest but represent conditions that may be detected prior to arrest and may be treatable. The symptomatic expression of Long-QT syndrome is quite broad and more often presents with syncope rather than cardiac arrest. The risk of cardiac arrest is still present, and people with family histories of sudden cardiac arrests should be screened for LQTS and other treatable causes of lethal arrhythmia. Higher levels of risk for cardiac arrest are associated with female sex, more significant QT prolongation, history of unexplained syncope (fainting spells), or premature sudden cardiac death. Additionally, individuals with LQTS should avoid certain medications that carry the risk of increasing the severity of this conduction abnormality, such as certain anti-arrhythmic, anti-depressant, and quinolone or macrolide antibiotics.

Non-cardiac causes
Non-cardiac causes account for 15 to 25% of cardiac arrests. The most common non-cardiac causes are trauma, major bleeding (gastrointestinal bleeding, aortic rupture, or intracranial hemorrhage), hypovolemic shock, overdose, drowning, and pulmonary embolism. Cardiac arrest can also be caused by poisoning like the stings of certain jellyfish or through electrocution like lightning.

Reversible causes
Other non-cardiac causes of cardiac arrest may result from temporary disturbances in the body's homeostasis. This may be the result of changes in electrolyte ratios, oxygen saturation, or alterations of other ions influencing the body's pH.

Mnemonic for reversible causes

"Hs and Ts" is a mnemonic used to remember the treatable or reversible causes of cardiac arrest. Note: This mnemonic includes causes of cardiac and non-cardiac origin, but all are reversible with appropriate and time-sensitive treatment.

 Hs
 Hypovolemia – A lack of blood volume
 Hypoxia – A lack of oxygen
 Hydrogen ions (acidosis) – An abnormal pH in the body
 Hyperkalemia or hypokalemia – An increased or decreased blood potassium
 Hypothermia – A low core body temperature
 Hypoglycemia or hyperglycemia – A low or high blood glucose
 Ts
 Tablets or toxins, such as drug overdose
 Cardiac tamponade – Fluid building up around the heart
 Tension pneumothorax – A collapsed lung
 Thrombosis (myocardial infarction) – A heart attack
 Thromboembolism (pulmonary embolism) – A blood clot in the lung
 Traumatic cardiac arrest

Children 
In children, the most common cause of cardiopulmonary arrest is shock or respiratory failure that has not been treated. Heart arrhythmia is not the most common cause in children. When there is a cardiac arrhythmia, it is most often asystole or bradycardia, in contrast to ventricular fibrillation or tachycardia as seen in adults. Other causes can include drugs such as cocaine and methamphetamine or overdose of medications such as antidepressants in a child who was previously healthy but is now presenting with a dysrhythmia that has progressed to cardiac arrest. Common causes of sudden unexplained cardiac arrest in children include hypertrophic cardiomyopathy, coronary artery abnormalities, and arrhythmias.

Mechanism

The definitive electrical mechanisms of cardiac arrest, which may arise from any of the functional, structural, or physiologic abnormalities mentioned above, are characterized by tachyarrhythmic or bradyarrhythmic events that do not result in systole. The tachyarrhythmias can be further classified as Ventricular fibrillation (V-fib) and pulseless or sustained Ventricular tachycardia (V-tach), both of which are rapid and erratic arrhythmias that alter the circulatory pathway such that adequate blood flow cannot be sustained and is inadequate to meet the body's needs.

The mechanism responsible for the majority of sudden cardiac deaths is ventricular fibrillation. Ventricular fibrillation is a tachyarrhythmia characterized by turbulent electrical activity in the ventricular myocardium leading to a heart rate too disorganized and rapid to produce any meaningful cardiac output, thus resulting in insufficient perfusion of the brain and essential organs. In ventricular tachycardia, the heart also beats faster than normal, which may prevent the heart chambers from properly filling with blood. Some of the electrophysiologic mechanisms underpinning ventricular fibrillations include ectopic automaticity, re-entry, and triggered activity. Structural changes in the diseased heart as a result of inherited factors (mutations in ion-channel coding genes, for example) cannot explain the suddenness of sudden cardiac death.

Both ventricular fibrillation and ventricular tachycardia can result in the heart ineffectively pumping blood to the body. Ventricular tachycardia is characterized by an altered QRS complex and a heart rate greater than 100 beats per minute. When V-tach is sustained (lasts for at least 30 seconds), inadequate blood flow to heart tissue can lead to cardiac arrest.

Bradyarrhythmias occur following dissociation of spontaneous electrical conduction and the mechanical function of the heart resulting in pulseless electrical activity (PEA) or through complete absence of electrical activity of the heart resulting in asystole. Similar to the result of tachyarrhythmias, these conditions lead to an inability to sustain adequate blood flow as well, though in the case of bradyarrhythmias, the underlying cause is an absence of mechanical activity rather than rapid beats leading to disorganization.

Diagnosis

Cardiac arrest is synonymous with clinical death. Historical information and a physical exam can diagnose cardiac arrest and provide information regarding the potential cause and prognosis. The provider taking the person's clinical history should aim to determine if the episode was observed by anyone else, what time the episode took place, what the person was doing (in particular if there was any trauma), and if there were involvement of drugs. The physical examination portion of diagnosing cardiac arrest focuses on the absence of a pulse. In many cases, lack of a carotid pulse is the gold standard for diagnosing cardiac arrest. Lack of a pulse in the periphery (radial/pedal) may also result from other conditions (e.g. shock) or simply an error on the part of the rescuer. Studies have shown that rescuers may often make a mistake when checking the carotid pulse in an emergency, whether they are healthcare professionals or lay persons.

Point-of-care ultrasound (POCUS) is a tool that can be used to examine the movement of the heart and its force of contraction at the patient's bedside. POCUS can accurately diagnose cardiac arrest in hospital settings, overcoming some of the shortcomings of diagnosis through checking the central pulse (carotid arteries or subclavian arteries), as well as detecting movement and contractions of the heart.

Using POCUS, clinicians can have limited, two-dimensional views of different parts of the heart during arrest. These images can help clinicians determine whether electrical activity within the heart is pulseless or pseudo-pulseless, as well as help them diagnose the potentially reversible causes of an arrest. Published guidelines from the American Society of Echocardiography, American College of Emergency Physicians, European Resuscitation Council, and the American Heart Association, as well as the 2018 preoperative Advanced Cardiac Life Support guidelines, have recognized the potential benefits of using POCUS in diagnosing and managing cardiac arrest.

Owing to the inaccuracy of this method of diagnosis, some bodies like the European Resuscitation Council (ERC) have de-emphasized its importance. Instead, the current guidelines prompt individuals to begin CPR on any unconscious person with absent or abnormal breathing. The Resuscitation Council in the United Kingdom stands in line with the ERC's recommendations and those of the American Heart Association. They have suggested that the technique to check carotid pulses should be used only by healthcare professionals with specific training and expertise, and even then that it should be viewed in conjunction with other indicators like agonal respiration.

Various other methods for detecting circulation and therefore diagnosing cardiac arrest have been proposed. Guidelines following the 2000 International Liaison Committee on Resuscitation (ILCOR) recommendations were for rescuers to look for "signs of circulation" but not specifically the pulse. These signs included coughing, gasping, color, twitching, and movement. Per evidence that these guidelines were ineffective, the current ILCOR recommendation is that cardiac arrest should be diagnosed in all casualties who are unconscious and not breathing normally, a similar protocol to that which the European Resuscitation Council has adopted. In a non-acute setting where the patient is expired, diagnosis of cardiac arrest can be done via molecular autopsy or postmortem molecular testing, which uses a set of molecular techniques to find the ion channels that are cardiac defective. This could help elucidate the cause of death in the patient.

Other physical signs or symptoms can help determine the potential cause of the cardiac arrest. Below is a chart of the clinical findings and signs/symptoms a person may have and potential causes associated with them.

Classifications
Clinicians classify cardiac arrest into "shockable" versus "non-shockable", as determined by the EKG rhythm. This refers to whether a particular class of cardiac dysrhythmia is treatable using defibrillation. The two "shockable" rhythms are ventricular fibrillation and pulseless ventricular tachycardia, while the two "non-shockable" rhythms are asystole and pulseless electrical activity.

Prevention 
With the lack of positive outcomes following cardiac arrest, efforts have been spent finding effective strategies to prevent cardiac arrest. With the prime causes of cardiac arrest being ischemic heart disease, efforts to promote a healthy diet, exercise, and smoking cessation are important. For people at risk of heart disease, measures such as blood pressure control, cholesterol lowering, and other medico-therapeutic interventions are used. A Cochrane review published in 2016 found moderate-quality evidence to show that blood pressure-lowering drugs do not reduce the risk of sudden cardiac death. Exercise is an effective preventative measure for cardiac arrest in the general population but may be risky for those with pre-existing conditions. The risk of a transient catastrophic cardiac event increases in individuals with heart disease during and immediately after exercise. The lifetime and acute risks of cardiac arrest are decreased in people with heart disease who perform regular exercise, perhaps suggesting the benefits of exercise outweigh the risks.

Diet
According to a study published in the Journal of the American Heart Association in 2021, diet may be a modifiable risk factor that leads to a lower incidence of sudden cardiac death. The study found that those who fell under the category of having "Southern diets" representing those of "added fats, fried food, eggs, organ and processed meats, and sugar‐sweetened beverages" had a positive association with an increased risk of cardiac arrest, while those deemed following the "Mediterranean diets" had an inverse relationship regarding the risk of cardiac arrest. The American Heart Association also has diet recommendations aimed at preventing cardiovascular disease.

Additionally, marine-derived omega-3 polyunsaturated fatty acids (PUFAs) have been promoted for preventing sudden cardiac death due to their postulated ability to lower triglyceride levels, prevent arrhythmias, decrease platelet aggregation, and lower blood pressure. According to a systematic review published in 2012, omega-3 PUFA supplementation is not associated with a lower risk of sudden cardiac death.

Code teams
In medical parlance, cardiac arrest is referred to as a "code" or a "crash". This typically refers to "code blue" on the hospital emergency codes. A dramatic drop in vital sign measurements is referred to as "coding" or "crashing", though coding is usually used when it results in cardiac arrest, while crashing might not. Treatment for cardiac arrest is sometimes referred to as "calling a code".

Patients in general wards often deteriorate for several hours or even days before a cardiac arrest occurs. This has been attributed to a lack of knowledge and skill amongst ward-based staff, in particular, a failure to measure the respiratory rate, which is often the major predictor of a deterioration and can often change up to 48 hours prior to a cardiac arrest. In response, many hospitals now have increased training for ward-based staff. A number of "early warning" systems also exist that aim to quantify the person's risk of deterioration based on their vital signs and thus provide a guide to staff. In addition, specialist staff are being used more effectively to augment the work already being done at the ward level. These include:
 Crash teams (or code teams) – These are designated staff members with particular expertise in resuscitation who are called to the scene of all arrests within the hospital. This usually involves a specialized cart of equipment (including a defibrillator) and drugs called a "crash cart" or "crash trolley".
 Medical emergency teams – These teams respond to all emergencies with the aim of treating people in the acute phase of their illness in order to prevent a cardiac arrest. These teams have been found to decrease the rates of in-hospital cardiac arrest (IHCA) and improve survival.
 Critical care outreach – In addition to providing the services of the other two types of teams, these teams are responsible for educating non-specialist staff. In addition, they help to facilitate transfers between intensive care/high dependency units and the general hospital wards. This is particularly important as many studies have shown that a significant percentage of patients discharged from critical care environments quickly deteriorate and are re-admitted; the outreach team offers support to ward staff to prevent this from happening.

Implantable cardioverter defibrillator

An implantable cardioverter defibrillator (ICD) is a battery-powered device that monitors electrical activity in the heart, and when an arrhythmia is detected, can deliver an electrical shock to terminate the abnormal rhythm. ICDs are used to prevent sudden cardiac death (SCD) in those who have survived a prior episode of sudden cardiac arrest (SCA) due to ventricular fibrillation or ventricular tachycardia (secondary prevention). ICDs are also used prophylactically to prevent sudden cardiac death in certain high-risk patient populations (primary prevention).

Numerous studies have been conducted on the use of ICDs for the secondary prevention of SCD. These studies have shown improved survival with ICDs compared to the use of anti-arrhythmic drugs. ICD therapy is associated with a 50% relative risk reduction in death caused by an arrhythmia and a 25% relative risk reduction in all-cause mortality.

Primary prevention of SCD with ICD therapy for high-risk patient populations has similarly shown improved survival rates in several large studies. The high-risk patient populations in these studies were defined as those with severe ischemic cardiomyopathy (determined by a reduced left ventricular ejection fraction (LVEF)). The LVEF criteria used in these trials ranged from less than or equal to 30% in MADIT-II to less than or equal to 40% in MUSTT.

Management
Sudden cardiac arrest may be treated via attempts at resuscitation. This is usually carried out based on basic life support, advanced cardiac life support (ACLS), pediatric advanced life support (PALS), or neonatal resuscitation program (NRP) guidelines.

Cardiopulmonary resuscitation
Early cardiopulmonary resuscitation (CPR) is essential to surviving cardiac arrest with good neurological function. It is recommended that it be started as soon as possible with minimal interruptions once begun. The components of CPR that make the greatest difference in survival are chest compressions and defibrillating shockable rhythms. After defibrillation, chest compressions should be continued for two minutes before another rhythm check. This is based on a compression rate of 100-120 compressions per minute, a compression depth of 5–6 centimeters into the chest, full chest recoil, and a ventilation rate of 10 breath ventilations per minute. Correctly performed bystander CPR has been shown to increase survival; it is performed in fewer than 30% of out-of-hospital cardiac arrests (OHCAs) . If high-quality CPR has not resulted in return of spontaneous circulation (ROSC) and the person's heart rhythm is in asystole, discontinuing CPR and pronouncing the person's death is generally reasonable after 20 minutes. Exceptions to this include certain cases with hypothermia or drowning victims. Some of these cases should have longer and more sustained CPR until they are nearly normothermic. Longer durations of CPR may be reasonable in those who have cardiac arrest while in hospital. Bystander CPR by the lay public before the arrival of EMS also improves outcomes.

Either a bag valve mask or an advanced airway may be used to help with breathing particularly since vomiting and regurgitation are common, especially in OHCA. If this occurs, then modification to existing oropharyngeal suction may be required, such as the use of Suction Assisted Laryngoscopy Airway Decontamination. High levels of oxygen are generally given during CPR. Tracheal intubation has not been found to improve survival rates or neurological outcomes in cardiac arrest and in the prehospital environment, may worsen it. Endotracheal tubes and supraglottic airways appear equally useful. When done by EMS, 30 compressions followed by two breaths appear better than continuous chest compressions and breaths being given while compressions are ongoing.

For bystanders, CPR that involves only chest compressions results in better outcomes as compared to standard CPR for those who have gone into cardiac arrest due to heart issues. Mouth-to-mouth as a means of providing respirations to the patient has been phased out due to the risk of contracting infectious diseases from the patient. Mechanical chest compressions (as performed by a machine) are no better than chest compressions performed by hand. It is unclear if a few minutes of CPR before defibrillation results in different outcomes than immediate defibrillation. If cardiac arrest occurs after 20 weeks of pregnancy, the uterus should be pulled or pushed to the left during CPR. If a pulse has not returned by four minutes, an emergency Cesarean section is recommended.

Defibrillation

Defibrillation is indicated if an electric-shockable heart rhythm is present. The two shockable rhythms are ventricular fibrillation and pulseless ventricular tachycardia. In children, 2 to 4 J/Kg is recommended.

In out-of-hospital arrests, the defibrillation is made by an automated external defibrillator (AED), a portable machine that can be used by any user: it provides voice instructions that guide the process, automatically checks the victim's condition, and applies the appropriate electric shocks. Some defibrillators even provide feedback on the quality of CPR compressions, encouraging the lay rescuer to press the person's chest hard enough to circulate blood.

In addition, there is increasing use of public access defibrillation. This involves placing AEDs in public places and training staff in these areas on how to use them. This allows defibrillation to occur prior to the arrival of emergency services, which has been shown to increase chances of survival. It has been shown that those who have arrests in remote locations have worse outcomes following cardiac arrest.

Medications

, medications other than epinephrine (adrenaline), while included in guidelines, have not been shown to improve survival to hospital discharge following OHCAs. This includes the use of atropine, lidocaine, and amiodarone. Epinephrine in adults, as of 2019, appears to improve survival but does not appear to improve neurologically normal survival. It is generally recommended every three to five minutes. Epinephrine acts on the alpha-1 receptor, which in turn increases the blood flow that supplies the heart. This would assist with providing more oxygen to the heart. Based on 2019 guidelines, 1 mg of epinephrine may be administered to patients every 3–5 minutes, but doses higher than 1 mg of epinephrine are not recommended for routine use in cardiac arrest. If the patient has a non-shockable rhythm, epinephrine should be administered as soon as possible. For a shockable rhythm, epinephrine should only be administered after an initial defibrillation attempt. Vasopressin overall does not improve or worsen outcomes compared to epinephrine. The combination of epinephrine, vasopressin, and methylprednisolone appears to improve outcomes. Some of the lack of long-term benefits may be related to delays in epinephrine use. While evidence does not support its use in children, guidelines state its use is reasonable. Lidocaine and amiodarone are also deemed reasonable in children with cardiac arrest who have a shockable rhythm. The general use of sodium bicarbonate or calcium is not recommended. The use of calcium in children has been associated with poor neurological function as well as decreased survival. Correct dosing of medications in children is dependent on weight. To minimize time spent calculating medication doses, the use of a Broselow tape is recommended.

The 2010 guidelines from the American Heart Association no longer contain the recommendation for using atropine in pulseless electrical activity and asystole for lack of evidence supporting its use. Neither lidocaine nor amiodarone, in those who continue in ventricular tachycardia or ventricular fibrillation despite defibrillation, improves survival to hospital discharge, despite both equally improving survival to hospital admission.

Thrombolytics may cause harm but may be of benefit in those with a confirmed pulmonary embolism as the cause of arrest. Evidence for use of naloxone in those with cardiac arrest due to opioids is unclear, but it may still be used. In those with cardiac arrest due to local anesthetic, lipid emulsion may be used.

Targeted temperature management
Current international guidelines suggest cooling adults after cardiac arrest using targeted temperature management (TTM), which was previously known as therapeutic hypothermia. There are several methods used to lower the body temperature, such as applying ice packs or cold-water circulating pads directly to the body or infusing cold saline. This is followed by gradual rewarming over the next 12 to 24 hrs.

The effectiveness of TTM after OHCA is an area of ongoing study. Pre-hospital TTM after OHCA has been shown to increase the risk of adverse outcomes. The rates of re-arrest may be higher in people who were treated with pre-hospital TTM. TTM in post-arrest care has not been found to improve mortality or neurological outcomes. Moreover, TTM may have adverse neurological effects in people who survive post-cardiac arrest.

Do not resuscitate
Some people choose to avoid aggressive measures at the end of life. A do not resuscitate order (DNR) in the form of an advance health care directive makes it clear that in the event of cardiac arrest, the person does not wish to receive cardiopulmonary resuscitation. Other directives may be made to stipulate the desire for intubation in the event of respiratory failure or, if comfort measures are all that are desired, by stipulating that healthcare providers should "allow natural death".

Chain of survival
Several organizations promote the idea of a chain of survival. The chain consists of the following "links":
 Early recognition. If possible, recognition of illness before the person develops a cardiac arrest will allow the rescuer to prevent its occurrence. Early recognition that a cardiac arrest has occurred is key to survival, for every minute a patient stays in cardiac arrest, their chances of survival drop by roughly 10%.
 Early CPR improves the flow of blood and of oxygen to vital organs, an essential component of treating a cardiac arrest. In particular, by keeping the brain supplied with oxygenated blood, the chances of neurological damage are decreased.
 Early defibrillation is effective for the management of ventricular fibrillation and pulseless ventricular tachycardia.
 Early advanced care.
 Early post-resuscitation care, which may include percutaneous coronary intervention.

If one or more links in the chain are missing or delayed, then the chances of survival drop significantly.

These protocols are often initiated by a code blue, which usually denotes impending or acute onset of cardiac arrest or respiratory failure.

Other
Resuscitation with extracorporeal membrane oxygenation devices has been attempted with better results for in-hospital cardiac arrest (29% survival) than OHCA (4% survival) in populations selected to benefit most. Cardiac catheterization in those who have survived an OHCA appears to improve outcomes, although high-quality evidence is lacking. It is recommended to be done as soon as possible in those who have had a cardiac arrest with ST elevation due to underlying heart problems.

The precordial thump may be considered in those with witnessed, monitored, unstable ventricular tachycardia (including pulseless VT) if a defibrillator is not immediately ready for use, but it should not delay CPR and shock delivery or be used in those with unwitnessed OHCA.

Prognosis
The overall rate of survival among those who have cardiac arrest outside the hospital is 10%. Among those who have an OHCA, 70% occur at home, and their survival rate is 6%. For those who have an in-hospital cardiac arrest (IHCA), the survival rate one year from at least the occurrence of cardiac arrest is estimated to be 13%. One-year survival is estimated to be higher in people with cardiac admission diagnoses (39%) when compared to those with non-cardiac admission diagnoses (11%). Children rates of survival are 3 to 16% in North America. For IHCA, survival to discharge is around 22%. Those who survive to ROSC and hospital admission frequently present with Post-Cardiac Arrest Syndrome, which usually presents with neurological injury that can range from mild memory problems to coma.

Hypoxic ischemic brain injury is the most detrimental outcome for people suffering a cardiac arrest. Poor neurological outcomes following cardiac arrest are much more prevalent in countries that do not use withdrawal of life support (≈50%) as compared to those that do (less than 10%). Most improvements in cognition occur during the first three months following cardiac arrest, with some individuals reporting improvement up to one year post-cardiac arrest. 50 – 70% of cardiac arrest survivors report fatigue as a symptom, making fatigue the most prevalent patient-reported symptom.

Prognosis is typically assessed 72 hours or more after cardiac arrest. Rates of survival are better in those who had someone witness their collapse, received bystander CPR, and/or had either V-fib or V-tach when assessed. Survival among those with V-fib or V-tach is 15 to 23%. Women are more likely to survive cardiac arrest and leave the hospital than men.

A 1997 review found rates of survival to discharge of 14%, although different studies varied from 0 to 28%. In those over the age of 70 who have a cardiac arrest while in hospital, survival to hospital discharge is less than 20%. How well these individuals manage after leaving the hospital is not clear.

The global rate of people who were able to recover from OHCA after receiving CPR has been found to be approximately 30%, and the rate of survival to discharge from the hospital has been estimated at 9%. Survival to discharge from the hospital is more likely among people whose cardiac arrest was witnessed by a bystander or emergency medical services, who received bystander CPR, and who live in Europe and North America. Relatively lower survival to hospital discharge rates have been observed in Asian countries.

Epidemiology
The risk of cardiac arrest varies with geographical region, age, and gender. The lifetime risk is three times greater in men (12.3%) than women (4.2%) based on analysis of the Framingham Heart Study. This gender difference disappeared beyond 85 years of age. Around half of these individuals are younger than 65 years of age.

North America 
Based on death certificates, sudden cardiac death accounts for about 20% of all deaths in the United States. In the United States, approximately 326,000 cases of out-of-hospital and 209,000 cases of IHCA occur among adults annually, which works out to be an incidence of approximately 110.8 per 100,000 adults per year. In the United States, during-pregnancy cardiac arrest occurs in about one in twelve-thousand deliveries or 1.8 per 10,000 live births. Rates are lower in Canada.

Other regions 
Non-Western regions of the world have differing incidences. The incidence of sudden cardiac death in China is 41.8 per 100,000 and in South India is 39.7 per 100,000.

Society and culture

Names
In many publications, the stated or implicit meaning of "sudden cardiac death" is sudden death from cardiac causes. Some physicians call cardiac arrest "sudden cardiac death" even if the person survives. Thus one can hear mentions of "prior episodes of sudden cardiac death" in a living person.

In 2021, the American Heart Association clarified that "heart attack" is often mistakenly used to describe cardiac arrest. While a heart attack refers to death of heart muscle tissue as a result of blood supply loss, cardiac arrest is caused when the heart's electrical system malfunctions. Furthermore, the American Heart Association explains that "if corrective measures are not taken rapidly, this condition progresses to sudden death. Cardiac arrest should be used to signify an event as described above, that is reversed, usually by CPR and/or defibrillation or cardioversion, or cardiac pacing. Sudden cardiac death should not be used to describe events that are not fatal".

Slow code
A "slow code" is a slang term for the practice of deceptively delivering sub-optimal CPR to a person in cardiac arrest, when CPR is considered to have no medical benefit. A "show code" is the practice of faking the response altogether for the sake of the person's family.

Such practices are ethically controversial and are banned in some jurisdictions. The European Resuscitation Council Guidelines released a statement in 2021 that clinicians are not suggested to participate/take part in "slow codes". According to the American College of Physicians, half-hearted resuscitation efforts are deceptive and should not be performed by physicians or nurses.

See also 
 Chain of survival
 Sudden cardiac death of athletes
 Post-cardiac arrest syndrome

References

External links 

 The Center for Resuscitation Science at the Hospital of the University of Pennsylvania

Cardiac arrhythmia
Medical emergencies
Causes of death
Wikipedia medicine articles ready to translate
Wikipedia emergency medicine articles ready to translate